Point Penmarc'h, often spelled Point Penmarch, or in French Pointe de Penmarc'h, is the extremity of a small peninsula in Finistère department in Brittany in northwestern France, and the northern limit of the Bay of Biscay.

It contains the fortified remains of a town which was of considerable importance from the 14th to the 16th centuries, and included today's commune of Penmarc'h, which covers the harbours of Saint-Guénolé and Kerity. The town owed its prosperity to its cod-banks, the disappearance of which together with the discovery of the Newfoundland cod-banks and the pillage of the place by the bandit La Fontenelle in 1595 contributed to its decline.

The Phare d'Eckmühl, a lighthouse with a light visible for 60 nautical miles (111 kilometers), stands on the point.

See also
Penmarc'h

References

Merriam-Webster's Geographical Dictionary, Third Edition. Springfield, Massachusetts: Merriam-Webster Incorporated, 1997. .

Headlands of Brittany
Landforms of Finistère